"Enemy" is a song by Swedish singer Sandro Cavazza. The song was released on 26 April 2019 and peaked at number 43 in Sweden. Cavazza told Scandipop the song "is about the feeling of not being able to let go, you'd do whatever it takes to keep what you're about to lose." 
Cavazza told Billboard "The song makes me feel euphoric although it is quite tragic lyrically. I wrote the song with my amazing friend Victor Thell who I work insanely fast with. Half the song was written by me and Victor in Stockholm and the other half in Los Angeles."

Reception
Scandipop said "Pleasingly, he's seemingly taken influence from not just his work with Avicii, but also the Avicii tribute track he made with Kygo "Happy Now". As a result, he's come out with a super-catchy, bop-along-song that is tailor-made for summertime radio."

Track listing

Charts

Release history

References

2019 singles
Swedish pop songs
2019 songs
Sandro Cavazza songs
Songs written by Sandro Cavazza